Dream Lake is a freshwater lake located on the southern slope of Dog Mountain in King County, Washington, United States. It is west of Otter Lake, part of the Alpine Lakes Wilderness. Big Creek, a tributary to the Taylor River, exits Dream Lake into a canyon that produces Big Creek Falls. Because of its proximity to Dog Mountain summit and the cirque of Rooster Mountain to the west, the lake is a popular area for hiking, swimming, and fishing and rainbow trout. Access to Dream Lake is provided through an unmaintained access trail that splits off the Snoqualmie Lake Trail.

A short distance west of Dream Lake is a short side trail that branches off Taylor River Trail, shortly after the crossing of Otter Creek, that leads to Otter Falls, a snow-driven waterfall which drops directly into Lipsy Lake. Marten Lake is further west past Otter Falls.

See also 
 List of lakes of the Alpine Lakes Wilderness

References 

Lakes of King County, Washington
Lakes of the Alpine Lakes Wilderness
Okanogan National Forest